State Ministry for Peace Affairs, officially known as State Ministry for Peace (SMP) was an Afghan government ministry responsible for peace process focused on to end ongoing wars in Afghanistan diplomatically. Founded in July 2019 by the government of Afghanistan, it advocated peace negotiations and future political stability in the country. SMP ministry was tasked with various drivers such as monitoring Afghanistan conflict and carrying negotiations with those individuals, groups and organisations involving Afghan war and Taliban insurgency in particular.

It also worked with United Nations, United States Agency for International Development, and World Bank for economic development in the country. It is engaged in community development programmes through various platforms such as Community Development Councils and citizen charter program to achieve pre-determined goals focused on economic, community and peace development.

Following the fall of Kabul and the reinstatement of the Islamic Emirate of Afghanistan, the Ministry was disbanded on 26 December 2021.

History 
Prior to SMP, the peace process was tasked to Afghan High Peace Council that worked for over ten years from 2010 until it was dissolved in 2019 following SMP's formation.

Consisting of 21 members of negotiating team within the ministry, including five women, it represented Afghan government diplomatically while opponents members represents Taliban under peace deal signed by the US and Taliban.

Following the fall of Kabul to the Taliban, the Ministry was disbanded by the new Islamic Emirate of Afghanistan on 26 December 2021.

References

External links 
 

Government ministries of Afghanistan
Peace processes
War in Afghanistan (2001–2021)
2019 establishments in Afghanistan
Government agencies of Afghanistan
2019 in Afghanistan